Ayyanan Ambalam was an Indian politician, belonging to the All India Forward Bloc. He was born July 15, 1924. He attended school up to IV Form, and joined politics in 1942.

In 1965 he was elected Chairman of the Panchayat Union Council, Madurai East.

Ayyanan Ambalam was elected Member of the Tamil Nadu Legislative Council on April 21, 1970, representing Madurai Local Authorities.

References

1924 births
All India Forward Bloc politicians
Members of the Tamil Nadu Legislative Council